Bad Girls Club: Redemption is the thirteenth installment of the Oxygen reality television series Bad Girls Club. It premiered on October 7, 2014 and concluded on January 6, 2015. The season featured an alumni cast consisting of nine women from the previous seasons. It is the second season to feature life coach Laura Baron from the twelfth season.

Cast 
The season began with nine original bad girls, of which one left voluntarily and three were removed by production. One replacement bad girl was introduced in their absences later in the season.

Duration of cast

Episodes

Notes

References

External links

2014 American television seasons
2015 American television seasons
Bad Girls Club seasons
Television shows set in Los Angeles